Breiðablik (sometimes anglicised to Breithablik or Breidablik) is the home of the god Baldr in Nordic mythology.

The name can also refer to:

Locations
 Breidablik Peak, a mountain in Canada
 Breidablick, Washington, a community in the USA

Sports
 Breiðablik (sports club), a sports club in Kópavogur, Iceland
 Breiðablik men's basketball, department of the Breiðablik sports club
 Breiðablik women's basketball, department of the Breiðablik sports club